The ARCHOS 101 Internet Tablet is part of the Archos Generation 8 tablet range, distributed between 2010–11. After a hardware upgrade, it was also part of Generation 9 range sold between 2011–12. It is a 10.1 inch (256.5 mm) Internet tablet with dual-boot capability running Android out of the box.

Features

Display
The Archos 101 IT is a 10.1 inch capacitive, multitouch screen tablet. It includes a WSVGA 1024x600 LCD screen with a pixel density of 118 ppi. The device also includes a light sensor and TFT technology.

Hardware & Battery
The devices uses a Li-Polymer irreplaceable battery. The battery's life for music playback is 36 hours while 7 hours for video playback.

The tablet includes an ARM Cortex-A8 single core processor, and 256 MB of RAM with a Texas Instruments OMAP 3660 chipset. It is sold with 8 and 16GB version with expandable memory (microSD, microSDHC) of up to 32GB.

Connectivity
The device includes Bluetooth support for 2.1, EDR Advanced Audio Distribution (A2DP), Audio/Video Control Transport Protocol (AVCTP), Audio/Video Distribution Transport Protocol (AVDTP), Audio/Visual Remote Control Profile (AVRCP), Generic Access (GAP), Generic Audio/Video Distribution (GAVDP), Object Push (OPP), Phone Book Access (PBAP), Service Discovery Protocol (SDP). It also includes 802.11 b, g, n Wi-Fi connectivity.

The Archos tablet also includes a USB 2.0 for mass storage device and USB charging, miniHDMI (Type C), 3.5 mm headphone jack, and computer/OTA sync.

Other Features
Accelerometer
.3 MP VGA camera for video calling.
Sound recording.
Built-In Loudspeakers
Supports MP3, AAC, AAC+, FLAC, WMA, WAV, OGG for audio playback.
Supports MPEG4, H.264, Motion JPG, WMV for video playback.
Browsing supports HTML, HTML5, XHTML, WAP 2.0, Adobe Flash.
Unlimited entries, caller groups, multiple numbers per contact, search by both first and last name, picture ID, ring ID.
Includes Android Calendar, Alarm, Calculator.
Supports E-mail, Instant Messaging, and Games.

References

External links
ARCHOS Official Website

Android (operating system) devices
Tablet computers